Daniel Nghipandulwa (born 8 June 1985) is a Namibian middle distance athlete. Nghipandulwa competed in the 2011 World Championships. He didn't manage to get past the heats with a time of 1:48.79. Nghipandulwa is also the Namibian record holder for the 800 metres with a time of 1:46.62.

defending 800m and 1500m since 2005 to 2021 in namibian national championship.

Achievements

External links

1985 births
Living people
Namibian male middle-distance runners
Athletes (track and field) at the 2011 All-Africa Games
African Games competitors for Namibia